Peter Anthony Joseph Daniel Wrenshall (22 December 1911 – 16 April 2003) better known by his stage name Danny O'Dea was an English actor.

Danny O'Dea was a British funnyman born out of the finest Music Hall tradition, he left a legacy which spans eight decades and reads like a history of British comedy. He performed alongside some of the biggest names in the business including Arthur Askey, Les Dawson, Dick Emery, John Inman Victoria Wood and Cilla Black, entering showbiz at an early age thanks to an enviable pedigree and working until he was 90, most recently enjoying popularity as long-sighted Eli Duckett in Last of the Summer Wine.  He made numerous appearances as Eli Duckett in the British sitcom Last of the Summer Wine between 1986 and 2002. His film roles include Paddie, an elderly man in Rita, Sue and Bob Too in 1986. His stage work included two pantomimes at the Swansea Grand Theatre in Wales: Robin Hood and Puss in Boots.

Personal life and death
He was married to Doris Smith from 1950 until her death on 10 October 2000, the marriage produced two children. He died on 16 April 2003 in Hartshead, Yorkshire, aged 91.

Filmography

References

External links

1911 births
2003 deaths
English male television actors
20th-century English male actors
British male comedy actors